Chris McLemore (born December 31, 1963) is a former American football running back. He played for the Indianapolis Colts in 1987 and for the Los Angeles Raiders from 1987 to 1988.

References

1963 births
Living people
American football running backs
Colorado Buffaloes football players
Arizona Wildcats football players
Indianapolis Colts players
Los Angeles Raiders players
New York/New Jersey Knights players